Cyperus maranguensis is a species of sedge that is native to parts of eastern Africa. This species was first identified by K.Schum, the first scientific description dating to 1895. The plant is also apart of the Cyperus genus.

Description
It produces small, greenish-brown flowers in clusters at the top of the stem. C. maranguensis is often found growing in damp or marshy areas, such as along streams and rivers, and is often used as an ornamental plant in gardens.

Taxonomy
The species was first formally described by the botanist Karl Moritz Schumann in 1895 as a part of the work Die pflanzenwelt Ost-Afrikas und der nachbargebiete by Adilf Engler.

Distribution
Overall, C. maranguensis is considered by many in Kenya, Tanzania, Uganda, and Mozambique. to be valuable plant species with a range of uses and ecological benefits.

Uses
In traditional medicine, the leaves and roots of C. maranguensis are used to treat a variety of ailments, including fever, stomachache, and dysentery. The plant is also used to make baskets and mats, and the leaves are sometimes used for thatching roofs. 

C. maranguensis is considered to be a useful plant for stabilizing soil and preventing erosion, and it is sometimes planted for this purpose in areas prone to landslides. It is also an important food source for livestock and wild animals, including antelopes, elephants, and hippopotamuses.

See also 
 List of Cyperus species

References 

maranguensis
Plants described in 1895
Flora of Kenya
Flora of Ethiopia
Flora of Tanzania
Flora of Uganda
Taxa named by Karl Moritz Schumann